Caroline Bilton (born Caroline Davis on 3 February 1976 in Anlaby, Humberside) is a British television presenter, currently the stand-in anchor of the BBC regional news programme Look North, broadcast from Hull to the East Riding of Yorkshire and Lincolnshire when Peter Levy is on leave.

References

External links
 Caroline Bilton profile.
 BBC Look North: East Yorkshire and Lincolnshire

British reporters and correspondents
British television presenters
English television presenters
BBC people
1976 births
Living people
Journalists from Kingston upon Hull
People educated at Wolfreton School